The 1893 Malatya earthquake occurred at 02:30 local time on 3 March in Malatya, Eastern Anatolia Region of Turkey. It had a surface wave magnitude of 7.1 and reached maximum felt intensity of X (Extreme) on the Mercalli intensity scale. This destructive earthquake caused 885 deaths and 164 injuries.

Tectonic setting
The fault produced large earthquakes in 1789 (M 7.2), 1795 (M 7.0), 1872 (M 7.2), 1874 (M 7.1), 1875 (M 6.7), 1893 (M 7.1), and 2020 (6.8). These earthquakes ruptured individual segments of the fault. The seismically active Palu and Pütürge segments in the east display a recurrence interval of about 150 years for M 6.8–7.0 earthquakes. The Pazarcık and Amanos segments in the west have recurrence intervals of 237–772 years and 414–917 years, respectively, for M 7.0–7.4 earthquakes. This intracontinental transform fault is the second largest strike-slip fault in Turkey.

Earthquake
The shock had a surface wave magnitude of 7.1 and was assigned a maximum intensity of X (Extreme) on the Mercalli intensity scale. was part of a seismic sequence involving  6.7–7.0 earthquakes along the East Anatolian Fault from 1866 to 1905. It ruptured a segment of the fault southwest of Lake Hazar.

Impact
A total of 885 people died and 164 were injured. In Akcedağ, 2,719 of its 11,740 homes were totally destroyed, 1,345 were uninhabitable and 2,195 were damaged. An estimated 5,100 homes in the villages between Malatya and Pütürge were destroyed; the remaining 1,900 were damaged. In these villages, 42 marketplaces, two mosques, a church and school were also destroyed. The death toll in the villages stood at 285 and 77 were injured. At least 3,260 sheep and 226 cattle also died. In Adıyaman, 22 died and 26 were injured; a third of its 3,500 homes were razed; another third were damaged. Eight villages near Malatya were demolished and 124 deaths were reported. In Malatya, homes were damaged though few collapsed; about 300 people died. Three churches, 47 mosques, 14 religious schools, the barracks in the town and two telegraph stations were razed. Some homes and government buildings in Elbistan and Gaziantep were destroyed. Aftershocks which were felt until 12 March caused further damage. A cholera outbreak the same year killed 896 people. The reconstruction of demolished buildings began in 1894.

See also
 List of historical earthquakes
 List of earthquakes in Turkey

References

Earthquakes in Turkey
History of Malatya Province
1893 in the Ottoman Empire
History of Malatya